Laal Ishq may refer to:
 "Laal Ishq" (song), a Hindi song from the 2013 Bollywood film Goliyon Ki Raasleela Ram-Leela
 Laal Ishq (Pakistani TV series), a 2017 Pakistani drama serial
 Laal Ishq (Indian TV series), a 2018 Indian Hindi romantic/horror television series
 Laal Ishq (film), a 2016 Indian Marathi-language romance mystery thriller film